Nikolai Zhilin (born May 23, 1992) is a Russian professional ice hockey defenceman. He is currently playing for Yuzhny Ural Orsk of the Supreme Hockey League (VHL).

Zhilin made his KHL debut playing with  Avtomobilist Yekaterinburg during the 2013–14 KHL season, playing ten games and registering one assist.

References

External links

1992 births
Living people
Ariada Volzhsk players
Avtomobilist Yekaterinburg players
HC Izhstal players
Russian ice hockey defencemen
PSK Sakhalin players
Sokol Krasnoyarsk players
Sportspeople from Khabarovsk
Sputnik Nizhny Tagil players
Yermak Angarsk players
Yuzhny Ural Orsk players
MsHK Žilina players
Russian expatriate sportspeople in Slovakia
Russian expatriate sportspeople in China
Expatriate ice hockey players in China
Expatriate ice hockey players in Slovakia
Russian expatriate ice hockey people